Blackmoor railway station, situated near to Blackmoor Gate at the western boundary of Exmoor National Park, England, was a station on the Lynton and Barnstaple Railway, a narrow gauge line that ran through Exmoor from Barnstaple to Lynton and Lynmouth in North Devon.

History

The station opened with the line on 11 May 1898, and closed with it after service on 29 September 1935. From 1923 until closure, the line was operated by the Southern Railway.

At a crossroads and coaching stage, the station was provided with a range of stables, since converted to human habitation. The station building has been extended over the trackbed, in a sympathetic style, and is now a licensed restaurant. The bridge under the crossroads has been filled in.

A large livestock market was established across the road from the station, and it was originally envisaged by the promoters of the L&B that this would generate a healthy income. North Devon farmers, however, preferred to drive their cattle to market across country, than pay to have them shipped by rail.

References

Former Lynton and Barnstaple Railway stations
Railway stations in Great Britain opened in 1898
Railway stations in Great Britain closed in 1935
Disused railway stations in Devon
Exmoor